This is a summary of 1952 in music in the United Kingdom, including the official charts from that year.

This year was a turning point for music in not only the UK, but all over the world. The first official UK Singles Chart  began in November 1952, compiled by the NME. This made the United Kingdom the first country in the world to have an official singles chart and created it in many other countries, with the Billboard Hot 100 era beginning in 1958 in the U.S. The singles chart quickly became a phenomenon  and record breaking became a new excitement for the public. Compiled solely on sales; it kept this trend until April 2005, when it was combined with legal downloads.

Summary

The Official UK Singles Chart
On the week ending 14 November 1952, NME published the first ever UK Singles Chart. Only a Top 12 at the time, it slowly grew over the years as nowadays sales data is gathered electronically and a Top 200 is compiled weekly for industrial purposes. During the rest of the decade and the early 1960s, there were many different charts formed and the general public were all confused as to which was the most accurate. The Official Charts Company uses NME until March 1960 and then uses Record Retailer until 1969, when an official sole chart was formed by an alliance between the two most popular charts.

To kick off the brand new chart, American jazz singer Al Martino had the first ever number one single in the UK with "Here in My Heart", which remains his biggest selling single. The song spent nine consecutive weeks at number one, which continued to be the longest consecutive run at number one until mid-1954. In second place was pop singer Jo Stafford with "You Belong to Me", and, with the exception of one week, she stayed just one place behind the top spot for nine weeks, until she finally managed to knock Al Martino off the top in 1953. Another record-achiever went to English traditional pop music singer Vera Lynn, who had three singles within the top 10 at the same time with "Forget Me Not (Vera Lynn song)" (at number 7), "The Homing Waltz" (at number 9), and "Auf Wiederseh'n Sweetheart" (at number 10).

Other artists that had chart success in 1952 included Bing Crosby, Guy Mitchell, Mario Lanza, Rosemary Clooney, and Kay Starr, who had hits with "The Isle of Innisfree", "Feet Up", "Because You're Mine", "Half as Much", and "Comes A-Long A-Love".

Number Ones

Number-one singles 
{| class="wikitable" style="font-size:97%; text-align:center;"
! Issue Date !! Song !! Artist
|-
| 8 November || rowspan="8"|"Here in My Heart" || rowspan="8"|Al Martino 
|-
| 15 November 
|-
| 22 November  
|-
| 29 November 
|-
| 5 December  
|-
| 12 December 
|-
| 19 December  
|-
| 26 December  
|}

Classical music
Benjamin Britten – Canticle II: Abraham and Isaac.
William Walton – Coronation Te Deum for the coronation of Queen Elizabeth II.

Opera
Michael Tippett – The Midsummer Marriage (not performed until 1955)

Film and Incidental music
William Alwyn 
The Card, starring Alec Guinness.
Mandy directed by Alexander Mackendrick, introducing Mandy Miller and starring Jack Hawkins.
Malcolm Arnold 
The Holly and the Ivy, starring Ralph Richardson, Celia Johnson, and Margaret Leighton.
The Sound Barrier directed by David Lean, starring Ralph Richardson.
Francis Chagrin – The Happy Family, starring Stanley Holloway, Kathleen Harrison and Naunton Wayne.
Brian Easdale – Outcast of the Islands directed by Carol Reed, starring Robert Morley, Trevor Howard, Ralph Richardson and Wendy Hiller.
 Benjamin Frankel – The Importance of Being Earnest directed by Anthony Asquith, starring Michael Redgrave.
Philip Green – The Yellow Balloon
Antony Hopkins – The Pickwick Papers, starring James Hayter.

Births
15 January – Melvyn Gale, cellist (Electric Light Orchestra)
4 February – Jerry Shirley, drummer (Humble Pie and Fastway)
17 February – Michael Marra, singer-songwriter (died 2012)
21 February – Jean-Jacques Burnel, bassist The Stranglers
5 March – Alan Clark, keyboard player
19 March – Derek Longmuir, drummer (Bay City Rollers)
9 May – Linda Finnie, Scottish soprano
10 May – Lee Brilleaux, South African-English singer-songwriter (Dr Feelgood) (died 1994)
9 June – Robert Sandall, musician, music journalist and radio presenter (died 2010)
12 June – Oliver Knussen, Scottish composer (died 2018)
14 June – Jim Lea, guitarist (Slade)
3 July – Andy Fraser, singer-songwriter and bass player (Free, Sharks, and John Mayall & the Bluesbreakers)
16 July – Gary Howard, musician (The Pathfinders)
19 July – Dominic Muldowney, composer
21 August – Joe Strummer, musician (The Clash) (died 2002)
30 August – Simon Bainbridge, composer (died 2021)
9 September – Dave Stewart, record producer (Eurythmics)
26 September – Cilla Fisher, Scottish folk singer-songwriter (The Singing Kettle)
2 October – Raymond Sargent, actor, musician and dramatist (died 2008)
2 December – James Lancelot, organist and conductor
27 December – David Knopfler, musician (Dire Straits)

Deaths
5 February – Adela Verne, pianist and composer, 74
10 April – Frederic Austin, baritone singer and composer, 80
18 April – Leo Smith, cellist, composer and teacher who worked in Canada, 70
19 April – Steve Conway, singer (b. 1920)
25 July – Herbert Murrill, organist and composer, 53
6 September – Gertrude Lawrence, actress, singer, dancer (b. 1898)
16 September – Vesta Tilley, music hall entertainer (b. 1864)
21 October – Charles Draper, clarinetist, 82
17 November – Charles Penrose, music hall performer (b. 1873)
date unknown
Charles Ancliffe, composer, 72
Mary Lucas, composer, 70

See also
 1952 in British television
 1952 in the United Kingdom
 List of British films of 1952

References

General
 (Type artist or song into search box and click "Search". To view a certain chart week, type the date into the box with the date and click "Go".)

 
British Music, 1952 In
Music
British music by year
20th century in music